The 2011 Grand Prix SAR La Princesse Lalla Meryem was a professional women's tennis tournament played on outdoor clay courts. It was the eleventh edition of the tournament which was part of the 2011 WTA Tour. It took place in Fes, Morocco between 18 and 24 April 2011.

WTA entrants

Seeds

 Rankings are as of April 11, 2011.

Other entrants
The following players received wildcards into the singles main draw:
  Fatima Zahrae El Allami
  Nadia Lalami
  Aravane Rezaï

The following players received entry from the qualifying draw:

  Irina-Camelia Begu
  Silvia Soler Espinosa
  Kristýna Plíšková
  Urszula Radwańska

The following players received entry from a Lucky loser spot:
  Eleni Daniilidou

Withdrawals
  Jelena Dokić (illness)

Champions

Singles

 Alberta Brianti def.  Simona Halep, 6–4, 6–3
It was Brianti's first career title.

Doubles

 Andrea Hlaváčková /  Renata Voráčová def.  Nina Bratchikova /  Sandra Klemenschits, 6–3, 6–4

External links
Official Website

Grand Prix SAR La Princesse Lalla Meryem
Morocco Open
2011 in Moroccan tennis
April 2011 sports events in Africa